Gose Elbe is a river of Hamburg, Germany. It was an anabranch of the Elbe, but the inflow closed by a dike in 1390. It flows into the Dove Elbe near Reitbrook.

See also
List of rivers of Hamburg

Rivers of Hamburg
Bergedorf
Rivers of Germany